In Greek mythology, Chione or Khionê (Ancient Greek: Χιονη from χιών – chiōn, "snow") was a consort of Boreas. The account of Pseudo-Plutarch makes her a daughter of Arcturus; she is said to have been abducted by Boreas and brought by him to Mount Niphantes, where she bore him a son Hyrpax, who later inherited the throne of King Heniochus; the mountain was said to have been called "The Bed of Boreas" from that circumstance. The name of Hyrpax is otherwise unknown, but Aelian mentions Boreas and Chione as the parents of three Hyperborean priests of Apollo; according to Diodorus Siculus, a whole dynasty of Hyperborean kings and priests claimed descent from Boreas.

References

Parents of demigods in classical mythology